Young Folks was a weekly children's literary magazine published in the United Kingdom between 1871 and 1897. It was first published in Manchester, but moved to London in 1873. It is most notable for having first published a number of novels by Robert Louis Stevenson in serial form, including Treasure Island, Kidnapped, and The Black Arrow.

It was aimed at both boys and girls, and at a somewhat older audience than many of its contemporaries. First sold for one half-penny with eight pages, the price was increased to one penny in 1873 and the page count increased to sixteen. Its motto was To Inform, To Instruct, To Amuse.

Young Folks went under a number of different names in its 26-year history:
Our Young Folks' Weekly Budget (1 January 187128 June 1879) (447 editions)
 as Young Folks' Weekly Budget (18761879)
 as Young Folks' Budget (1879)
Young Folks (5 July 187920 December 1884) (326 editions)
Young Folks' Paper (27 December 188428 June 1891)
Old and Young (4 July 189111 September 1896)
Folks at Home (18 September 189629 April 1897)

The proprietor and sometimes editor of the magazine was James Henderson. Young Folks serialised Treasure Island in Volumes 19 and 20 from 1 October 1881 to 28 January 1882. It ran under the title Treasure Island; or, the mutiny of the Hispaniola and under the pseudonym Captain George North. It made little difference to the sales of the mazazine. Robert Leighton recalled that: "The boy readers did not like the story. As a serial it was a failure. Boys like a story to plunge at once into the active excitement . . ."

The Black Arrow—published under the same pseudonym—was serialised between 30 June and 30 October 1883. As a serial it was, unlike Treasure Island, a huge success. Kidnapped was serialised in the magazine from May to July 1886.

Editors

Other editors were Clinton Leighton and Richard Quittenton (22 November 183323 January 1914) who wrote under the pseudonym Roland Quiz and worked on the magazine for 42 years.

Artists 
John Proctor (AKA 'Puck') was a regular contributor in the 1870s.

References

Further reading

Frederick Wilse Bateson, The Cambridge Bibliography of English Literature (Cambridge University Press, 1966).

19th-century British children's literature
1871 establishments in the United Kingdom
1897 disestablishments in the United Kingdom
Children's magazines published in the United Kingdom
Weekly magazines published in the United Kingdom
Defunct literary magazines published in the United Kingdom
Magazines established in 1871
Magazines disestablished in 1897